The Serbian (Rascian) Militia (or ) was a military unit of the Habsburg-Austrian army consisting of Serbs, that existed in ca. 1686–1704.

During the Great Turkish War (1686–99) 

After allied Christian forces had captured Buda from the Ottoman Empire in 1686 during the Great Turkish War, Serbs from Pannonian Plain (present-day Hungary, Slavonia region in present-day Croatia, Bačka and Banat regions in present-day Serbia) joined the troops of the Habsburg monarchy as separate units known as Serbian Militia. Serbs, as volunteers, massively joined the Austrian side.

In the first half of 1688 the Habsburg army together with units of Serbian Militia captured Gyula, Lipova and Ineu from the Ottoman Empire. After Belgrade had been liberated from the Ottomans in 1688, Serbs from the territories in the south of Sava and Danube rivers began to join Serbian Militia units. One of the first commanders of the Serbian Militia during the Great Turkish War was Antonije Znorić. In the period 1689—1691, one of the commanders of Serbian Militia units in Banat was Novak Petrović.

The Ottoman Empire had suffered partial military collapse against the Austrians in the 1680s, most notably at the Battle of Vienna in 1683, and the loss of Belgrade to Maximilian II of Bavaria in 1688 and Bosnia in 1689. However, with the beginning of the Nine Years War in the west, the early 1690s saw an end to Habsburg conquests in the Balkans and a partial Ottoman recovery. Despite the Ottoman recovery and the weakening of the Habsburg military presence on the Danube (most Habsburg soldiers were sent to fight against the France in the War of the Grand Alliance) the Habsburg supreme command planned offensive activities against Ottomans, heavily relying on the Serb soldiers of Serbian Militia and Serb rebels in the Balkans. In 1689 Louis William was appointed as chief commander of the Imperial army in its invasion of the territory of present-day Serbia. Before the invasion Louis William recruited Serb rebels all over territory of present-day Serbia, whose infantry units were called hayduks while cavalry units of Serb rebels were called Serb husars.

On August 29, 1689 Serbian Militia under the command of Pavle Nestorović as a vanguard unit of the Habsburg army were victorious against a vanguard unit of the Ottoman army during the Battle of Batočina. On 4 October 1689 Nestorović was appointed as commander of all units of Serbian Militia in Serbia.

Jovan Monasterlija, who was appointed as captain of Serbian Militia in 1690, recruited Serbs into his units in the summer of 1690 on the southern border of the Austrian Empire. During the Battle of Slankamen on August 19, 1691, Serbian Militia with 10,000 Serbs under the command of Jovan Monasterlija participated in the important victory over Ottoman forces. When Austrian forces supported by Serbian Militia captured Oradea from Ottomans in the spring of 1692, the seat of the Serbian Militia's headquarter became Baja. As reward for the important part he played during the Battle of Zenta, Jovan Tekelija was appointed as Captain of Serbian Militia in Arad in 1698.

The Austrian Empire had intentions to reduce the power and importance of Serbian Militia and its military and religious leaders by dividing it to smaller units and sending them to different distant parts of the Empire. Monasterlija's rank was changed from Serbian vice-voivode and Chief of the Serbian Nation to Rascian obercaptain. Because of the constant Ottoman threat such plans were never fully implemented.

After the Treaty of Karlowitz (1699) 

After the Habsburg monarchy signed the Treaty of Karlowitz in 1699, Serbs who settled the Military Frontier began to lose their hopes to recapture Serbia from Ottomans and to return to their homes they left during the Great Serb Migration. Since they were subjected to continuous attempts of authorities to Catholicize them or to remove their privileges including their rights to own arable land, members of Serbian Militia began to consider migration to Russian Empire.

In 1704 Monasterlija's Serbian Militia was defeated in the battle with Rákóczi's rebels near Baja and many Serbs escaped from the town. Serbian Militia had important role in the struggle against Rákóczi's rebels. Austrian government supported privileged position of the Serbian Militia which they perceived as counterweight to separatist aspirations of Hungarian officials and well trained and cheap military force which could be used to fight against Ottomans or other enemy. From the same reasons, Hungarian officials had hostile relation toward Serbian Militia.

Commanders 
Antonije Znorić
Pavle Nestorović Deak
Jovan Monasterlija Komoranac
Subota Jović
Novak Petrović
Sekula Vitković
Pane Božić
Stefan Prodan Šteta
Jovan Popović Tekelija

See also
Serbian Militia (1718–39)
Serbian Free Corps

Annotations
The organization was officially named "Serbian National Militia".

References

Sources 
 
 
 

 
Military history of Austria
Military history of Serbia
Military history of the Holy Roman Empire
17th century in Serbia
18th century in Serbia
17th-century establishments in Serbia
Serbia under Habsburg rule
Vojvodina under Habsburg rule
History of Bačka
History of Banat
Cavalry units and formations
Infantry units and formations
Habsburg Serbs
Military units and formations of the Early Modern period
Military Frontier
1686 establishments in the Habsburg monarchy
Military units and formations established in 1686